The 2012 United States House of Representatives elections in Michigan was held on Tuesday, November 6, 2012, to elect the 14 U.S. representatives from the state of Michigan, a decrease of one following the 2010 United States Census. The elections coincided with the elections of other federal and state offices, including a quadrennial presidential election and an election to the U.S. Senate. Primary elections were held on August 7, 2012. The filing deadline for candidates to file to run in the primary was May 15. Except for two seats, all the incumbents sought re-election.  The open seats were the 5th and 11th Congressional Districts.  Due to the loss of one seat from the 2010 Census, two congressmen ran against each other. Despite Democrats winning more than 240,000 more votes for U.S. House districts statewide, Republicans won nine of 14 seats and Michiganders tied a state record by electing the lowest rate (35 percent) of U.S. Representatives by a major party whilst simultaneously casting its electoral votes for that party's presidential nominee.

Overview

Redistricting
The Michigan Legislature, which is controlled by the Republican Party, began the redistricting process on April 11, 2011. A plan released by the Republican Party in June 2011, which would place the homes of Democrats Gary Peters and Sander Levin into the same district, was passed by the Michigan House of Representatives and Senate later that month. The plan was signed into law by Governor Rick Snyder on August 9. The two incumbents forced to face each other were Gary Peters and Hansen Clarke.

District 1
In redistricting, the 1st district was made slightly more favorable to Republicans: Republican nominee John McCain received less than one percentage point more of the vote in the 2008 presidential election in the newly drawn district compared to the former district. Roll Call  had rated the race as "Leans Republican," but changed the rating first to "Tossup" and then "Leans Democratic." Republican Dan Benishek, who was first elected to represent the 1st district in 2010, ran for re-election.

The third-party candidates were Emily Salvette as the Libertarian Party nominee and Ellis Boal as the Green Party nominee.

Republican primary

Candidates

Nominee
Dan Benishek, incumbent U.S. Representative

Primary results

Democratic primary

Candidates

Nominee
Gary McDowell, former state representative and nominee for this seat in 2010

Withdrawn
Derek Bailey, tribal chairman of the Grand Traverse Band of Ottawa and Chippewa Indians (running for the 101st State House district)

Primary results

General election

Endorsements

Polling

Predictions

Results

District 2
Republican Bill Huizenga, who was first elected to represent the 2nd district in 2010, sought re-election.  He was unopposed for the Republican primary.
Other third-party candidates on the ballot were Mary Buzuma for the Libertarian Party, Ronald Graeser for the U.S. Taxpayers Party and William Opalicky for the Green Party.
Roll Call rates the race as "Safe Republican", and Huizenga won easily re-election with 61.2% of the vote.

Republican primary

Candidates

Nominee
Bill Huizenga, incumbent U.S. Representative

Declined
David Agema, state representative

Primary results

Democratic primary
Muskegon city commissioner Willie German Jr ran in the August primary as a write-in candidate after David Takitaki, a political science professor at Adrian College and Muskegon Community College, was seeking the Democratic nomination to challenge Huizenga, but withdrew from the race for health reasons. Commissioner German was therefore on the ballot on the Democratic side.

Candidates

Nominee
 Willie German Jr, Muskegon city commissioner

Withdrawn
David Takitaki, political science professor at Adrian College and Muskegon Community College

Primary results

General election

Endorsements

Results

District 3
Republican Justin Amash, who was first elected to represent the 3rd district in 2010, is seeking re-election and ran unopposed in the Republican primary.
Libertarian Party candidate Bill Gelineau is also on the ballot.

In redistricting, the 3rd district was made more favorable to Democrats. Roll Call  rate the race as "Likely Republican."

Republican primary

Candidates

Nominee
Justin Amash, incumbent U.S. Representative

Declined
Terri Lynn Land, former Michigan Secretary of State

Primary results

Democratic primary

Candidates

Nominee
Steve Pestka, former state representative, former judge, former Kent County Commissioner and small business owner

Eliminated in primary
Trevor Thomas, former employee in the executive office of Jennifer Granholm

Declined
Pat Miles, lawyer and nominee for this seat in 2010
Mark Schauer, former U.S. Representative

Endorsements

Primary results

General election

Endorsements

Polling

Predictions

Results

District 4
Republican David Lee Camp, who has represented the 4th district since 1993 and previously represented the 10th district from 1991 until 1993, will seek re-election. Roll Call rates the race as "Likely Republican".

Republican primary

Candidates

Nominee
David Lee Camp, incumbent U.S. Representative

Primary results

Democratic primary

Candidates

Nominee
Debra Friedell Wirth, attorney

Primary results

General election

Endorsements

Results

District 5
Democrat Dale Kildee, who has represented the 5th district since 2003 and previously represented the 9th district from 1993 until 2003 and the 7th district from 1977 until 1993, chose to retire rather than run for re-election in 2012. 

Flint school board member David Davenport ran as an independent. Also running was Gregory Creswell of the Libertarian Party.

Roll Call rated the race as "Safe Democratic".

Democratic primary

Candidates

Nominee
Dan Kildee, former Genesee County treasurer and nephew of Dale Kildee

Declined
 Jim Barcia, former U.S. Representative
 Deborah Cherry Genesee County treasurer 
 John Cherry, former Lieutenant Governor 
 David Crim, union organizer 
John Gleason, state senator
Dale Kildee, incumbent U.S. Representative
Woodrow Stanley, state representative

Primary results

Republican primary

Candidates

Nominee
Jim Slezak, former Democratic state representative

Eliminated in primary
Tom Wassa, Tuscola County public safety officer Slezak defeated Wassa in the GOP primary.

Primary results

General election

Endorsements

Results

District 6
Republican Fred Upton, who has represented the 6th district since 1993 and previously represented the 4th district from 1987 until 1993, will seek re-election.

Jason Gatties, a business manager and security consultant from St. Joseph, received the US Taxpayers Party of Michigan's nomination at their state convention on June 16, 2012. Christie Gelineau received the Libertarian Party's nomination at their state Saturday June 2, 2012. Roll Call rates the race as "Likely Republican".

Republican primary

Candidates

Nominee
Fred Upton, incumbent U.S. Representative

Eliminated in primary
Jack Hoogendyk, former state representative and candidate for this seat in 2010

Polling

Primary results

Democratic primary

Candidates

Nominee
Mike O'Brien, project leader at Herman Miller and former organic farmer

Withdrawn
John Waltz, Iraq and Afghanistan war veteran, nominee for Kentucky's 4th congressional district in 2010 but dropped out in February 2012 because of an illness.

Primary results

General election

Endorsements

Predictions

Results

District 7
In redistricting, the 7th district was made slightly more favorable to Republicans: McCain received less than one percentage point more of the vote in the 2008 presidential election in the newly drawn district compared to the former district.

Republican Tim Walberg, who has represented the 7th district since January 2011 and previously served from 2007 until 2009, is running for re-election. Roll Call rates the race as "Likely Republican".

Republican primary

Candidates

Nominee
Tim Walberg, incumbent U.S. Representative

Eliminated in primary
Dan Davis, businessman and former police officer
Mike Stahly, former member of Potterville City Council and candidate for this seat in 2010

Primary results

Democratic primary
Joe Schwarz, who represented the 7th district from 2005 to 2007 as a Republican and was defeated by Walberg in the Republican primary in 2006, had been recruited by the Democratic Congressional Campaign Committee.

Candidates

Nominee
Kurt Haskell, attorney

Eliminated in primary
Ruben Marquez, chair of the Jackson County Democratic Party

Declined
Mark Schauer, former U.S. Representative 
Joe Schwarz, former Republican U.S. Representative

Endorsements

Primary results

General election

Endorsements

Predictions

Results

District 8
Republican Mike Rogers, who has represented the 8th district since 2001, sought re-election.

Other candidates were Daniel Goebel of the Libertarian Party and independent candidate Preston Brooks. Roll Call rated the race as "Likely Republican".

Republican primary

Candidates

Nominee
Mike Rogers, incumbent U.S. Representative

Eliminated in primary
Brian Hetrick, mechanical engineer
Vernon Molnar

Primary results

Democratic primary

Candidates

Nominee
Lance Enderle, former teacher and nominee for this seat in 2010

Primary results

General election

Endorsements

Results

District 9
In redistricting, the homes of Democratic Representatives Sander Levin and Gary Peters were drawn into the 9th district, which comprises mostly Macomb County but also includes a part of Oakland County.
Levin, who has represented the 12th district since 1993 and previously represented the 17th district from 1983 until 1993, will seek re-election here.  Peters, who has represented the 9th district since 2009, will seek re-election in the redrawn 14th district.

Jim Fulner, an engineer from Berkley, earned the Libertarian Party nomination at their state convention June 2, 2012, in Livonia. Julia Williams, the 2010 Green Party Candidate for the same seat, was nominated again at the 2012 Michigan Green Party convention, Saturday June 9, 2012, in Mount Pleasant. Lester Townsend received the US Taxpayers Party of Michigan's nomination at their state convention Saturday June 16, 2012. This marks the fourth election cycle in a row Townsend has challenged Levin for his seat. Roll Call rates the race as "Likely Democratic".

Democratic primary

Candidates

Nominee
Sander Levin, incumbent U.S. Representative for the 12th district

Withdrawn
Allen James O'Neil, businessman

Primary results

Republican primary

Candidates

Nominee
Don Volaric, businessman and nominee for the 12th district in 2010

Eliminated in primary
Gregory Dildilian, woodworker

Primary results

General election

Endorsements

Results

District 10
Republican Candice Miller, who has represented the 10th district since 2003, will seek re-election. Roll Call rates the race as "Likely Republican".

Republican primary

Candidates

Nominee
Candice Miller, incumbent U.S. Representative

Primary results

Democratic primary

Candidates

Nominee
Chuck Stadler, practical nurse and accountant

Eliminated in primary
Jerome Quinn, attorney

Primary results

General election

Endorsements

Results

District 11

Thad McCotter had represented the old 11th district since 2003 and sought the Republican presidential nomination. After poor polling results, McCotter ended his presidential campaign and announced plans to run again for his seat in Congress. On May 26, 2012, the Michigan Secretary of State announced McCotter had fallen well short of the required 1,000 petition signatures required for him to qualify for the primary ballot. In what state officials described as a level of fraud unprecedented in Michigan political history, subsequent reviews of McCotter's petitions revealed that over 85 percent of the signatures were invalid. Most of them were either duplicates or signatures that appeared to have been pasted from past years' petitions. Conceding that the signatures were indeed invalid, McCotter announced he would mount a write-in bid for his seat; however, he decided not to continue with his write-in bid on June 2 and announced his intention to retire after completing his term. McCotter suddenly resigned from his seat on July 6, leaving the 11th District unrepresented.

Secretary of State Ruth Johnson found the apparent fraud egregious enough to turn the evidence over to the Michigan Attorney General's office to determine if laws were broken regarding the invalid signatures.  The Michigan Attorney General's office charged four McCotter aides with forgery, although McCotter was not charged with any wrongdoing.

McCotter's resignation resulted in a special election, which was expected to cost taxpayers $650,000.

As a result of Republican-leaning areas of the old 9th district being drawn into the new 11th, the 11th district was made more favorable to Republicans.  McCain received four percentage points more of the vote in the 2008 presidential election in the newly drawn district compared to the current district. While Roll Call rated this race as "Likely Republican" before the primary, they changed the rating to "Leans Republican". It has since changed back to "Likely Republican."

Republican primary
For the regular primary held August 7, 2012, for the upcoming two-year term in Congress, Kerry Bentivolio, a veteran and former teacher who had already planned to challenge McCotter, was left the only candidate on the Republican primary ballot. The Troy Republican Club, U.S. House Member Justin Amash, Tea Party groups and Ron Paul's PAC all endorsed Bentivolio.  Other Republicans, including Oakland County Executive L. Brooks Patterson, refused to endorse Bentivolio and instead endorsed former state senator Nancy Cassis as a write-in candidate.  Bentivolio defeated Cassis in the August 7 primary, and was the only Republican candidate on the ballot in areas covered by the new 11th. Cassis and Drexel Morton also wrote as write-in candidates.

Bentivolio was endorsed by Gov. Rick Snyder, Lt. Gov. Brian Calley, Senator Rand Paul, and Congress members Candice Miller, Justin Amash, Dan Banishek and Ron Paul, and former officeholders Rick Santorum and Peter Hoekstra.

Candidates

Nominee
Kerry Bentivolio, veteran and former teacher

Eliminated in primary
Nancy Cassis, former state senator

Declined
Mike Kowall, state senator
Rocky Raczkowski, former state representative, nominee for U.S Senate in 2002 and nominee for 9th district in 2010
David Trott, attorney
Paul Welday, former Oakland County Republican Party Chair

Disqualified
Thad McCotter, incumbent U.S. Representative

Primary results

Democratic primary

Candidates

Nominee
Dr. Syed Taj, member of the Canton Township Board of Trustees

Eliminated in primary
Bill Roberts, follower of Lyndon LaRouche.

Declined
David Curson, labor activist and nominee for this seat in 2012 special election

Primary results

General election

Endorsements

Polling

Predictions

Results

Democratic candidate David Curson defeated Kerry Bentivolio in the special general election, conducted in the 2012-configured 11th district only, and coinciding with the regular general election on November 6.

District 12
Democrat John Dingell, who has represented the district since 2003 and previously from 1955 until 1965, and previously represented the 16th district from 1965 until 2003, will seek re-election here.  
Roll Call rates the race as "Safe Democratic".

Democratic primary

Candidates

Nominee
John Dingell, incumbent U.S. Representative for the 15th district

Eliminated in primary
Daniel Marcin, doctorate student at the University of Michigan

Declined
Sander Levin, incumbent U.S. Representative (running in the 9th district)

Primary results

Republican primary

Candidates

Nominee
Cynthia Kallgren, former candidate for State Representative

Eliminated in primary
Karen Jacobsen, businesswoman

Primary results

General election

Endorsements

Results

District 13
Democrat John Conyers, who has represented the 14th district since 1993 and previously represented the 1st district from 1965 until 1993, sought re-election in the new 13th district.

The Libertarian Party of Michigan has nominated Chris Sharer of Westland as their candidate. and Martin Gray is the U.S. Taxpayers Party candidate.

Roll Call rates the race as "Safe Democratic".

Democratic primary

Candidates

Nominee
John Conyers, incumbent U.S. Representative

Eliminated in primary
Glenn S. Anderson, state senator
John Goci Wayne-Westland school board member
Shanelle Jackson, state Representative
Bert Johnson, state senator

Disqualified
Godfrey Dillard, attorney

Declined
Hansen Clarke, incumbent U.S. Representative (running in the 14th district)

Endorsements

Polling

Primary results

Republican primary

Candidates

Nominee
Harry Sawicki

Primary results

General election

Endorsements

Results

District 14
The new 14th district crosses the traditional boundary of the 8 Mile Road (separating Detroit from Oakland County) in order to continue to have a majority of minority voters.  A large part of the district is now outside of Detroit (it comprises approximately 40 percent Detroit, 40 percent Oakland County, and 20 percent out lying Wayne County).

Leonard Schwartz, Lawyer and Perennial candidate from Oak Park, who most recently challenged Sandy Levin for US House District 12 in 2010, is the Libertarian Nominee. Douglas Campbell, an engineer from Ferndale, is the Green Party Candidate.
Roll Call rates the race as "Safe Democratic".

Democratic primary

Candidates

Nominee
Gary Peters, incumbent U.S. Representative for the 9th district

Eliminated in primary
Hansen Clarke, incumbent U.S. Representative for the 13th district
Bob Costello, magistrate for the 36th District Court
Brenda Lawrence, Mayor of Southfield and nominee for Lieutenant Governor in 2010
Mary Waters, former state representative and candidate for the 13th district in 2008,

Declined
John Conyers, incumbent U.S. Representative (running in the 13th district)
Geoffrey Feiger, attorney and nominee for Governor in 1998 
Irv Lowenberg, Southfield City Treasurer
Tim Melton, state representative
Buzz Thomas, state senator

Endorsements

Polling

Primary results

Republican primary

Candidates

Nominee
John Hauler, government contractor for ACE electronics

Primary results

General election

Endorsements

Results

References

External links
Elections at the Michigan Secretary of State
United States House of Representatives elections in Michigan, 2012 at Ballotpedia
Michigan U.S. House at OurCampaigns.com
Campaign contributions for U.S. Congressional races in Michigan at OpenSecrets
Outside spending at the Sunlight Foundation

Michigan
2012
United States House of Representatives